Michael Armitage may refer to:
 Michael Armitage (artist) (born 1984), Kenyan painter
 Michael Armitage (politician) (born 1949), Australian former politician
 Michael Armitage (RAF officer) (1930–2022), British Royal Air Force commander